GPHS can mean:

Schools
Australia:
 Glenmore Park High School, a co-educational, comprehensive government high school in Glenmore Park, New South Wales

Canada:
Grant Park High School, in Winnipeg, Manitoba, Canada

The Philippines:
 Gregorio Perfecto High School, in Manila, Philippines

United States:
 Gage Park High School, in Chicago, Illinois 
 Galena Park High School in Galena Park, Texas (Houston area)
 Gatlinburg-Pittman High School, in Gatlinburg, Tennessee
 Glacier Peak High School, in Snohomish, Washington
 Gwynn Park High School, in Brandywine CDP, Prince George's County, Maryland (Washington, DC area)

Other
 General Purpose Heat Source, a radioisotope source used in space power generation